Yünlüce may refer to:

 Yünlüce, Elâzığ
 Yünlüce, Lalapaşa
 Yünlüce, Lice